This is a list of banks in the United Arab Emirates.

List of National Banks

List of Foreign Banks (including wholesale banks)

See also 
 List of banks in the Arab world

References

External links 
Central Bank of the U.A.E.: Commercial Banks and Representative Offices in UAE

United Arab Emirates
Banks
United Arab Emirates